Glycol distearate is the diester of stearic acid and ethylene glycol. It is mostly commonly encountered in personal care products and cosmetics where it is used to produce pearlescent effects as well as a moisturizer.

Synthesis
Glycol distearate may be produced via the esterification of stearic acid (or its esters) with ethylene glycol. It can also be produced by a reaction of stearic acid with ethylene oxide.

Applications
When forced to crystalize as thin platelets glycol distearate can give liquids and gels a pearlescent appearance. This is often used by the producers of personal care products (e.g. shower gel) to increase the visual appeal of their products. It may also act as a skin moisturizer.

Glycol distearate is also commonly used as an embedding agent in microscopy.

See also
 Glycol stearate
 Ethylene bis(stearamide)

References

Stearate esters
Fatty acid esters
Cosmetics chemicals
Glycol esters